Science and technology is a growing field in Pakistan and has played an important role in the country's development since its founding. Pakistan has a large pool of scientists, engineers, doctors, and technicians assuming an active role in science and technology. The real growth in science in Pakistan occurred after the establishment of the Higher education Commission in 2002 which supported science in a big way and also became the major sponsor of the Pakistan Academy of Sciences under the leadership of Prof. Atta-ur-Rahman. The emphasis was placed on quality rather than numbers during this period. The quality measures introduced by Prof. Atta-ur-Rahman as Founding Chairman HEC included:1) All Ph.D. thesis were evaluated by eminent foreign scientists,2) All PhD theses and research papers were checked for plagiarism 3) Some 11,000 students were sent abroad to leading universities for PhD level training and absorbed on their return, 4) Appointments at faculty positions were linked to international stature of the applicants as judged from their international publications, patents and citations, and (5) Quality Enhancement Cells were established in all universities for the first time in the history of the country. (6) The minimum criteria for establishment of a new university were approved by the Cabinet and universities that did not meet this criteria were closed down. (7) The Model University Ordinance was approved (Appendix 3 in the reference) setting the governance parameters for new universities. (8) A list of fake higher education institutions was prepared and made public. (9) Quality Assurance Agency (QAA) was set up within the Higher Education Commission that established Quality Enhancement Cells (QECs) as its operational units in public and private-sector universities across the country. (10) The funding of universities was linked to excellence in teaching and research under a formula based funding mechanism that considered enrolment, subjects and quality of teaching and research. The first IT policy and implementation strategy was approved under the leadership of Prof. Atta-ur-Rahman, then Federal Minister of Science & technology, in August 2000 which laid the foundations of the development of this sector On the request of Prof. Atta-ur-Rahman, Intel initiated a nationwide programme to train school teachers in Information and Communication technologies in March 2002 which has led to the training of 220,000 school teachers in 70 districts and cities across Pakistan. A 15-year tax holiday was approved on the recommendation of Prof. Atta-ur-Rahman which has resulted in growth of IT business from $30 million in 2001 to over  $3 billion. The Pakistan Austria University of Applied Engineering (Fachhochschule) has been established in Haripur Hazara under a Steering Committee Chaired by  Prof. Atta-ur-Rahman in which students will get degrees from several Austrian universities. Pakistan's growth in scientific output can be seen from the fact that in 1990 Pakistan published 926 scholarly documents while in 2018 the number rose to 20548, a twenty times increase.In contrast India published 21443 scholarly documents in 1990 and the number rose to 171356 in 2018, an eight times increase. In 2018, 336 people per million were researchers in the R&D (Research and Development sector) in Pakistan compared to 256 people per million being researchers in India. The reforms begun by Prof. Atta-ur-Rahman FRS in 2003-2008 have continued over the subsequent decade and according to the Web of Science report, there was a 300% growth in research publications in 2019 over the decade, with 2019 marking the first year in which Pakistan was ranked above the world average in research. In 2019, Pakistan produced 300% more publications indexed in the Web of Science Core Collection than in 2010. In the decade of 2010-2019, more than half of Pakistan’s research was published in journals with Impact Factor. The global influence of Pakistan’s research is increasing as scientists in the country are publishing more in top quartile journals. The Category Normalized Citation Impact of Pakistan’s publications (which measures publications’ impact against their peers worldwide) has risen from 0.67 to 1.03. output. As of 2020, Pakistan has 85% teledensity with 183 million celllular, 98 million 3G/4G and 101 million broadband subscribers, due to the foundations laid by Prof. Atta-ur-Rahman of the IT and telecom industry during 2000-2008. In an analysis of scientific research productivity of Pakistan, in comparison to Brazil, Russia, India and China, Thomson Reuters has applauded the developments that have taken place as a result of the reforms introduced by Prof. Atta-ur-Rahman FRS, since Pakistan has emerged as the country with the highest increase in the percentage of highly cited papers in comparison to the "BRIC" countries

Chemistry remains the strongest subject in the country with the International Center for Chemical and Biological Sciences playing the lead role with the largest postgraduate research program in the country having about 600 students enrolled for PhD. Physics (theoretical, nuclear, particle, laser, and quantum physics), material science, metallurgy (engineering), biology, and mathematics, are some of the other fields in which Pakistani scientists have contributed. From the 1960s and onwards, the Pakistani government made the development and advancement of science a national priority and showered top scientists with honours. While the government has made efforts to make science a part of national development, there have been criticisms of federal policies, such as the government's dissolution of the Higher Education Commission of Pakistan (HEC)— an administrative body that supervised research in science – in 2011. This attempted dissolution failed to materialise because of a Supreme Court of Pakistan decision on a petition filed by Prof. Atta-ur-Rahman, former Federal Minister of Science & Technology and former founding Chairman of the Higher Education Commission. Pakistani scientists have also won acclaim in mathematics and in several branches of physical science, notably theoretical and nuclear physics, chemistry, and astronomy. Professor Abdus Salam, a theoretical physicist won the Nobel Prize in Physics in 1979, being the first and only Pakistani to date to have received the honor. Prof. Atta-ur-Rahman an organic chemist was elected as Fellow of Royal Society (London) in 2006 in recognition of his contributions in the field of natural products thereby becoming the first scientist from the Islamic world to receive this honour for work carried out within an Islamic country. The contributions of Prof. Atta-ur-Rahman to uplift science and higher education in Pakistan were internationally acknowledged and a tribute paid to him in the world's leading science journal Nature that termed him as "a force of nature". In an analysis of scientific research productivity of Pakistan, in comparison to Brazil, Russia, India, and China, Thomson Reuters has applauded the developments that have taken place as a result of the reforms introduced by Prof. Atta-ur-Rahman FRS, since Pakistan has emerged as the country with the highest increase in the percentage of highly cited papers in comparison to the "BRIC" countries. In recognition of building strong bridges between science in Pakistan and China, Prof. Atta-ur-Rahman FRS  received the highest national award of China, the "International Science and Technology Cooperation Award".  His book on NMR spectroscopy published by Springer Verlag was translated into Japanese language and used for teaching courses on NMR spectroscopy in Japan. His book entitled "Stereoselective Synthesis in Organic Chemistry" published by Springer Verlag was described as a "monumental tome" by the Nobel Laureate Sir Derek Barton who wrote the Foreword to this book.

Technology is highly developed in nuclear physics and explosives engineering, where the arms race with India convinced policymakers to set aside sufficient resources for research. Due to a programme directed by Munir Ahmad Khan and the Pakistan Atomic Energy Commission (PAEC), Pakistan is the seventh nation to have developed an atomic bomb, which the global intelligence community believes it had done by 1983 (see Kirana-I), nine years after India (see Pokhran-I). Pakistan first publicly tested its devices (see Chagai-I and Chagai-II) on 28 and 30 May 1998, two weeks after India carried out its own tests (See Pokhran-II).

Space exploration was hastily developed, in 1990 Pakistan launched Badr-1 followed by Badr-II in 2001. Since the 1980s, the space programme dedicated itself to military technologies (Space weapons programme and Integrated missile systems), and maintains a strong programme developed for military applications.

Pakistan is an associate member of CERN, one of the few countries to obtain that status. Pakistan was ranked 99th in the Global Innovation Index in 2021, up from 105th in 2019.

During 2018-2019, the Government of Pakistan has formed a number of Task Forces to strengthen science and technology, information technology and knowledge economy. The  task force formed in 2018 on "Technology Driven Knowledge Economy" is chaired by the Prime Minister Mr. Imran Khan and has Atta-ur-Rahman as its Vice Chairman  The group has several important Federal Ministers as members including  Ministers of Finance, Planning, Education,  IT/Telecom, Science & Technology and chairman Higher Education Commission. The task force aims to promote research in important and emerging technology fields. Another important task force of the Prime Minister is that on science & technology with Atta-ur-Rahman as its chairman. As a result of the efforts of these Task Forces under the leadership of Prof. Atta-ur-Rahman FRS, a huge change has occurred in the Ministry of Science and Technology and the development budget of the Federal Ministry of Science and technology has been enhanced by over 600% due to the projects initiated by these Task Forces, allowing a large number of new important initiatives in the fields of materials engineering, genomics, industrial biotechnology, alternative energy, minerals, regenerative medicine, neuroscience, and artificial intelligence to be undertaken. Pakistan's first foreign engineering university (Pak Austria Fachhochschule) is a unique hybrid model involving a Fachhochschule half and a postgraduate research half, with a central technology park.  With 8 foreign universities collaborating  (3 Austrian and 5 Chinese), it has also started functioning under the supervision of a steering committee headed by Atta-ur-Rahman in Haripur, Hazara.  A number of such foreign engineering universities are in the process of being established under the supervision of Prof. Atta-ur-Rahman FRS. These include one in Sialkot the foundation stone of which has already been laid by the Prime Minister of Pakistan, and another in the lands behind Prime Minister House, Islamabad

History

The Scientific and Technological Research Division (S&TR) was established in 1964 for (i) coordination and implementation of national science and technology policy; (ii) promotion and coordination of research and utilization of the results of research; (iii) development, production and utilization of nuclear energy; and (iv) coordination of utilization of scientific and technological manpower. The Division was administratively responsible for the National Science Council, the Council of Scientific and Industrial Research, the Atomic Energy Commission and Space and Upper Atmospheric Research Committee.
The Ministry of Science and Technology (MoS&T) has been functioning since 1972. It is the national focal point and enabling arm of Government of Pakistan for planning, coordinating and directing efforts; to initiate and launch scientific and technological programs and projects as per national agenda for sound and sustainable Science & Technology Research base for the socio-economic development.
From the areas of industrial development to renewable energy and rural development, the Ministry suggests technological development for higher growth-rates and to improve standards of living. Its principal focus is on building Pakistan's technological competence and developing a larger pool of human resources to reverse brain drain, and for integrating the existing technological infrastructure for the strengthening of technology institutions, effective governance of S&TR and enhancing the capacity of indigenous innovation systems.

Golden age of science

The 1960s and the 1970s period is regarded as the initial rise of Pakistan's science, which gained an international reputation in the different science communities of the world. During this period, scientists contributed to the fields of, particularly, Natural Product Chemistry, theoretical, particle, mathematical, and nuclear physics, and other major and subfields of Chemistry and Physics. The research was preceded by such scientists as Riazuddin, Ishfaq Ahmad, Salimuzzaman Siddiqui, Atta-ur-Rahman and Samar Mubarakmand. However, the major growth in scientific output occurred after the establishment of the Higher Education Commission which was accompanied by a 60-fold increase in funding for science

The real growth of science in Pakistan occurred under the leadership of Prof. Atta-ur-Rahman during 2000–2008 when he was the Federal Minister of Science & Technology and later Chairman of the Higher Education Commission (HEC) with the status of Federal Minister. The chairperson of the Senate Standing Committee on Education announced the first 6 years of HEC under Prof. Atta-ur-Rahman as "Pakistan's golden period". Thomson Reuters, in an independent assessment of Pakistan's progress in international publications, has acknowledged that in the last decade there has been a fourfold increase in international publications and a tenfold growth in highly cited papers, statistics that were better than the BRIC countries.

The remarkable transformation of science and higher education under the leadership of Prof. Atta-ur-Rahman as Federal Minister of Science & Technology and later as Chairman of Higher Education Commission with status of a Federal Minister during the period 2000–2008 was applauded by many independent experts and he was called a "force of nature" in a review published in Nature

Dr. Abdus Salam, the first Pakistani winner of the Nobel Prize in Physics, was the father of physics research in Pakistan. Under the watchful direction of Salam, mathematicians and physicists tackled the greatest and outstanding problems in physics and mathematics. From 1960 to 1974, Salam was responsible for leading the research at its maximum point. This prompted the international recognition of Pakistani mathematicians and physicists, allowing them to conduct their research at CERN. Salam and his students (Riazuddin, Fayyazuddin, and others) revolutionized particle and theoretical physics, are thought to be modern pioneers of particle physics at all aspect of it. Pure research was undertaken in Quantum electrodynamics, Quantum field theory, protonic decay and major fields in physics, were pioneered by Pakistan's scientists. With the establishment of nuclear and neutron institutes in the country, Pakistan's mathematicians introduced complex mathematical applications to study and examine the behaviours of elements during the fission process. Salimuzzaman Siddiqui, Atta-ur-Rahman and Iqbal Choudhary are the pioneering personalities for studying the isolation of unique chemical compounds from the Neem (Azadirachta indica), Rauvolfia, periwinkle (Catharanthus roseus), (Buxus papillosa) and various other plants.

State controlled science
Unlike some Western countries, the majority of the research programmes are conducted not at the institutions (such as universities) but at specially set up research facilities and institutes. These institutes are performed under the government's Ministry of Science that overlooks the development and promotion of science in the country, while others are performed under the Pakistan Academy of Sciences, other specialized academies and even the research arms of various government ministries. At first, the core of fundamental science was the Pakistan Academy of Sciences, originally set up in 1953 and moved from Karachi to Islamabad in 1964. The Pakistan Academy of Sciences has a large percentage of researchers in the natural sciences, particularly physics. From 1947 to 1971, the research was being conducted independently with no government influence. The High Tension Laboratories (HTL) at the Government College University, Lahore (GCU) was established by R. M. Chaudhry with funds given by the British government in the 1950s. In 1967, Professor Abdus Salam led the foundation of the Institute of Theoretical Physics (ITP) at the Quaid-e-Azam University, and the establishment of the Pakistan Institute of Nuclear Science and Technology (PINSTECH) and the Centre for Nuclear Studies; all were independently established by Pakistan's academic scientists with financial assistance provided by European countries. However, after Zulfikar Ali Bhutto became president, he took control of scientific research in 1972 as part of his intensified socialist reforms and policies. With advice taken from Dr. Mubashir Hassan, Bhutto established the Ministry of Science with Ishrat Hussain Usmani, a bureaucrat with a doctorate in atomic physics.

During the 1950s and 1960s, both West Pakistan and East Pakistan had their own academies of science, with East Pakistan relying on West Pakistan to allot the funds. Medical research is coordinated and funded by the Health Ministry and agricultural research is led by Agriculture Ministry and likewise, the research on environmental sciences is headed by the Environment Ministry.

The aftermath of the 1971 Indo-Pakistan Winter War was that President Bhutto increased scientific funding by the Government by more than 200%, mostly dedicated to military research and development. Bhutto, with the help of his Science Adviser Dr. Salam, gathered hundreds of Pakistani scientists working abroad to develop what became Pakistan's atom bomb. This crash programme was directed at first by Dr. Abdus Salam until 1974, and then directed and led by Dr. Munir Ahmad Khan from 1974 until 1991. For the first time, an effort was made by the government when Pakistan's citizens made advancements in nuclear physics, theoretical physics, and mathematics. In the 1980s, General Muhammad Zia-ul-Haq radicalized science by enforcing pseudoscience – by his Muslim fundamentalists as administrators – in Pakistan's schools and universities.  Zia-ul-Haq later promoted Dr. Abdul Qadeer Khan to export the sensitive industrial (military) technologies to Libya, Iran, and North Korea. Because of government control, academic research in Pakistan remains highly classified and unknown to the international scientific community. There have been several failed attempts made by foreign powers to infiltrate the country's research facilities to learn how much research has progressed and how much clandestine knowledge has been gained by Pakistan's scientists. One of the notable cases was in the 1970s when the Libyan intelligence made an unsuccessful attempt to gain knowledge on critical aspects of nuclear technology, and crucial mathematical fast neutron calculations in theoretical physics. It was thwarted by the ISI Directorate for Joint Intelligence Technical (JIT). From the 1980s and onward, both Russian intelligence and the Central Intelligence Agency made several attempts to access Pakistan's research but because of the ISI, they were unable to gain any information. From the period 1980 to 2004, research in science fell short until General Pervez Mushrraf established the Higher Education Commission (HEC) which heightened the contribution of science and technology in Pakistan. The major boost to science in Pakistan occurred under the leadership of Prof. Atta-ur-Rahman as the founding Chairman of the Higher Education Commission when about 11,000 students were sent to top universities abroad for Ph.D. and postdoctoral training. This has resulted in the enormous increase in the research output of Pakistan in Impact factor journals from about 800 per year in the year 2000 to over 12,000 publications per year. This drew positive comments from Thomson Reuters about the sharp increase in highly cited papers in comparison to Brazil, Russia, India and China Major research was undertaken by Pakistan's institutes in the field of natural sciences. In 2003, the Ministry of Science and Technology of the Government of Pakistan and the United States Department of State signed a comprehensive Science and Technology Cooperation Agreement that established a framework to increase cooperation in science, technology, engineering and education for mutual benefit and peaceful purposes between the science and education communities in both countries. In 2005, the United States Agency for International Development (USAID) joined with the Ministry of Science and Technology (MOST) and the Higher Education Commission of Pakistan to support the joint Pakistan-U.S. Science and Technology Cooperation Program. Beginning in 2008, the U.S. Department of State joined USAID as U.S. co-sponsor of the program. This program, which is being implemented by the National Academy of Sciences on the U.S. side, is intended to increase the strength and breadth of cooperation and linkages between Pakistan scientists and institutions with counterparts in the United States. However, with unfavourable situations, research declined. In 2011, the government dissolved the HEC and the control of education was taken over by governmental ministries. Prof. Atta-ur-Rahman filed a petition in the Supreme Court of Pakistan against the government action. The Supreme Court decided in favour of the stand taken by Prof. Atta-ur-Rahman, and the federal nature of the Higher Education Commission was preserved.

Science policy

National Science, Technology and Innovation Policy 
The Federal Ministry of Science and Technology has overseen the S&T sector since 1972. However, it was not until 2012 that Pakistan's first National Science, Technology and Innovation Policy was formulated: this was also the first time that the government had formally recognized innovation as being a long-term strategy for driving economic growth. The policy principally emphasizes the need for human resource development, endogenous technology development, technology transfer and greater international co-operation in research and development (R&D).

The policy was informed by the technology foresight exercise undertaken by the Pakistan Council for Science and Technology from 2009 onwards. By 2014, studies had been completed in 11 areas: agriculture, energy, ICTs, education, industry, environment, health, biotechnology, water, nanotechnology, and electronics. Further foresight studies were planned on pharmaceuticals, microbiology, space technology, public health, sewage, and sanitation, as well as higher education.

National Science, Technology and Innovation Strategy 
Following the change of government in Islamabad after the May 2013 general election, the new Ministry of Science and Technology issued the draft National Science, Technology and Innovation Strategy 2014–2018, along with a request for comments from the public. This strategy has been mainstreamed into the government's long-term development plan, Vision 2025, a first for Pakistan.

The central pillar of the draft National Science, Technology and Innovation Strategy is human development. Although the pathway to implementation is not detailed, the new strategy fixes a target of raising Pakistan's gross domestic expenditure on R&D (GERD) from 0.29% (2013) to 0.5% of GDP by 2015 then to 1% of GDP by the end of the current government's five-year term in 2018. The ambitious target of tripling the GERD/GDP ratio in just seven years is a commendable expression of the government's resolve but ambitious reforms will need to be implemented concurrently to achieve the desired outcome.

National prizes

The most prestigious government prize awarded for achievements in science and technology is Nishan-e-Imtiaz (or in English Order of Excellence). While Hilal-i-Imtiaz, Pride of Performance, Sitara-i-Imtiaz, and Tamgha-e-Imtiaz occupies a unique role and importance in Pakistan's civil society. Atta-ur-Rahman is the only scientist of Pakistan to have won all these 4 Civil Awards.

Achievements

In 1961, international achievements first recorded in 1961 when Pakistan became the third Asian country and tenth in the world when the Rehbar-I – a solid fuel expendable rocket— was launched from Sonmani Spaceport. The Rehbar-I was developed and launched under the leadership of Dr. W. J. M. Turowicz, a Polish-Pakistani scientist and then project director of this program. Since then, the program began taking flights which continued until the 1970s.

A major breakthrough occurred in 1979, when the Nobel Prize Committee awarded the Nobel Prize in Physics to Abdus Salam, for formulating the electroweak theory – a theory that provides the basis of unification of weak nuclear force and electromagnetic force. In 1990, the Space and Upper Atmosphere Research Commission (SUPARCO) launched the first, and locally designed, a communication satellite, Badr-1, from Xichang Satellite Launch Center (XLSC) of the People's Republic of China. With the launch, Pakistan became the first Muslim majority country to have developed an artificial robotic satellite, and was the second South Asian state to have launched its satellite, second to India.

One of the widely reported achievements was in 1998 when the country joined the nuclear club. In response to India's nuclear tests on 11 May and 13 May 1998, under codename Operation Shakti, in the long-constructed Pokhran Test Range (PTR). Under Prime Minister Nawaz Sharif, the Pakistan Atomic Energy Commission (PAEC) conducted five simultaneous tests at the Chagai Hills under codename Chagai-I on 28 May 1998. PAEC carried out another test in the Kharan Desert, under Chagai-II, meaning it had tested six devices in under one week. With the testing of these atomic devices, Pakistan became the seventh nuclear power in the world, and the only Muslim-majority country to have mastered the technology. On 13 August 2011, SUPARCO launched its first indigenously developed geosynchronous satellite, Paksat-1R also from XLSC in China.

In 2006 Prof. Atta-ur-Rahman was elected as Fellow of Royal Society (London), thereby becoming the first scientist from the Muslim world to be so honoured in recognition of researches and contributions carried out within an Islamic country. He has major contributions in the development of natural product chemistry and several international journals have published special issue in recognition of these contributions in his honour, He contributed to the major development of science and technology as Chairman Higher Education Commission during 2002–2008 which have resulted in a significant increase in research publications in Pakistan from only about 800 research papers in Impact Factor journals in 2002 to over 11,000 publications in 2016 the quality of which has been recognised by ThomsonReuters. The International Centre for Chemical and Biological Sciences at the University of Karachi which has developed as a leading research centre in the region under the leadership of Prof. Atta-ur-Rahman was designated as a UNESCO Centre of Excellence in 2016. Prof. Atta-ur-Rahman was awarded the high Civil Award of the Government of Austria (the 'Grosses goldenes Ehrenzeichen am Bande') in 2007 in recognition for his contributions for uplifting science in Pakistan, and the Government of China also honoured him with the highest Award for Foreigners (Friendship Award) in recognition of his eminent contributions. The largest university of Malaysia, Universiti Teknologi Mara, established a Research Centre entitled " Dr. Atta-ur-Rahman Research Institute of natural Product Discovery" to honour this great Muslim scientist for uplifting science in Pakistan and in the Muslim world in his capacity as Coordinator General COMSTECH, a Ministerial Committee comprising 57 Ministers of Science and Technology of the 57 OIC member countries. More recently, the leading Chinese University on Traditional Medicine in Changsha, Hunan has also decided to name a research institute in honour of Prof. Atta-ur-Rahman FRS, in recognition of his eminent contributions to uplift science in Pakistan and to establish strong linkages with China.

In another landmark study undertaken by Thomson Reuters, highlighting the impact of the reforms introduced by Atta-ur-Rahman, it was revealed that the rate of growth of highly cited papers from Pakistan in a decade was even greater than that in Brazil, Russia, India or China

Information technology 

The rapid progress made by Pakistan in the IT and telecom sector during 2000–2002, under Professor Atta-ur-Rahman as Federal Minister, led to the spread of internet from 29 cities in the year 2000 to 1,000 cities, towns and villages by 2002, and the spread of fiber from 40 cities to 400 cities in this period. The first IT policy and implementation strategy was approved under the leadership of Prof. Atta-ur-Rahman, then Federal Minister of Science & technology, in August 2000 which laid the foundations of the development of this sector The internet prices were reduced sharply from $87,000 per month for a 2 MB line to only $3000 per month and later to $90 per month. The mobile telephony boom also occurred under the leadership of Atta-ur-Rahman, and it began by the drastic lowering of prices, bringing in of competition (Ufone) and changing the system so that the person receiving a call was no longer required to pay any charges. A satellite was placed in space (Paksat 1) at a cost of only $4 million. These changes in the IT infra-structure proved invaluable for the Higher education sector. Pakistan Educational Research Network was set up in 2004 through which one of the finest digital libraries was established in universities. In 2002, few university libraries could subscribe to a handful of journals. Today every student in every public sector university has free access to over 20,000 international journals with back volumes and over 60,000 books from 250 international publishers.
As of 2011, Pakistan has over 20 million internet users and is ranked as one of the top countries that have registered a high growth rate in internet penetration. Overall, it has the 15th largest population of internet users in the world. In the fiscal year 2012–2013, the Government of Pakistan aims to spend 4.6 billion rupees (Rs.) on information technology projects, with emphasis on e-government, human resource and infrastructure development.
Pakistan's information technology industry has gone through a dramatic change, and the country has taken the lead in adopting some technologies while also setting an example for others in global best practices. Matters relating to the IT industry are overseen and regulated by the Ministry of Information Technology of the Government of Pakistan. The IT industry is regarded as a successful sector of Pakistan economically, even during the financial crisis. The Government of Pakistan has given numerous favors to IT investors in the country since the last decade, that resulted in the development of the IT sector. In the years 2003–2005 the country's IT exports saw a rise of about fifty percent and amounted a total of about US$48.5 million. The World Economic Forum, assessing the development of Information and Communication Technology in the country ranked Pakistan 102nd among 144 countries in the Global Information Technology report of 2012.

Higher education reforms

Reform 2002–2009 
In 2002, the University Grants Commission was replaced by the Higher Education Commission (HEC), which has an independent chairperson. The HEC was charged with reforming Pakistan's higher education system by introducing better financial incentives, increasing university enrolment and the number of PhD graduates, boosting foreign scholarships and research collaboration and providing all the major universities with state-of-the-art ICT facilities.

In a series of reforms in 2002, the HEC instituted major upgrades for scientific laboratories, rehabilitating existing educational facilities, expanding research support and overseeing the development of one of the best digital libraries in the region. Seeking to meet international standards, quality assurance and accreditation process was also established. Some ~95% of students sent abroad for training returned, an unusually high result for a developing country, in response to improved salaries and working conditions at universities as well as bonding and strict follow-up by the commission, Fulbright and others. Within a limited timespan, the HEC provided all universities with free, high-speed Internet access to scientific literature, an upgrade of research equipment accessible across the country and a programme for the creation of new universities of science and technology, including science parks which attracted foreign investors.

International praise : Pakistan's Golden Period for Higher Education 
Since the Higher Education Commission (HEC) reforms have been carried out in 2002, HEC has received praise from international higher education observers. Rahman, founding Chairman of HEC, has received a number of international awards for the transformation of the higher education sector under his leadership.[25] German academic, Dr. Wolfgang Voelter of Tübingen University in Germany over viewed the performance of HEC under the leadership of Rahman and described the reforms in HEC as "A miracle happened." After teaching and visiting in 15 universities of Pakistan, Voelter wrote that the "scenario of education, science and technology in Pakistan has changed dramatically, as never before in the history of the country.[25] The chairperson of the Senate Standing Committee on Education recently announced the first 6 years of HEC under Rahman as "Pakistan's golden period in higher education".

American academic Prof. Fred M. Hayward has also praised the reform process undertaken by Pakistan, admitting that "since 2002, a number of extraordinary changes have taken place." Hayward pointed out that "over the last six years almost 4,000 scholars have participated in Ph.D. programs in Pakistan in which more than 600 students have studied in foreign PhD programs'.

The HEC's reforms were also applauded by the United Nations Commission on Science and Technology for Development (UNCSTD) which reported that the "progress made was breath-taking and has put Pakistan ahead of comparable countries in numerous aspects." The UNCSTD has closely monitored the development in Pakistan in the past years, coming to the conclusion that HEC's program initiated under the leadership of Rahman is a "best-practice" example for developing countries aiming at building their human resources and establishing an innovative, technology-based economy.". According to an article published in the leading science journal Nature "Rahman's strong scientific background, enthusiasm for reform and impressive ability to secure cash made him a hit at home and abroad. "It really was an anomaly that we had a person of that stature with that kind of backing,----Atta-ur-Rahman was a force of nature

Rahman has won four international awards for the revolutionary changes in the higher education sector brought in the HEC. Nature, a leading science journal, has also written a number of editorials and articles about the transformation brought about in Pakistan in the higher education sector under the HEC. In an article entitled "Pakistan Threat to Indian Science" published in the leading daily newspaper Hindustan Times, India, it has been reported that Professor C. N. R. Rao, Chairman of the Indian Prime Minister's Scientific Advisory Council made a presentation to the Indian Prime Minister at the rapid progress made by Pakistan in the higher education sector under the leadership of Rahman, Chairman, Higher Education Commission. It was reported that as a result of the reforms, "Pakistan may soon join China in giving India serious competition in science". "Science is a lucrative profession in Pakistan. It has tripled the salaries of its scientists in the last few years."

Decentralizing the governance of higher education 
In 2011–2012, the HEC found itself on the brink of dissolution in the face of the 18th amendment to the Constitution, which devolved several governance functions to provincial governments, including that of higher education. It was only after Prof. Atta-ur-Rahman FRS former Chairman HEC filed a petition before the Supreme Court of Pakistan and the Supreme Court intervened in April 2011, that the commission was spared from being divided up among the four Provinces of Baluchistan, Khyber–Pakhtunkhwa, Punjab and Sindh.

Notwithstanding this, the HEC's developmental budget – that spent on scholarships and faculty training, etc. – was slashed by 37.8% in 2011–2012, from a peak of R. 22.5 billion (circa US$0.22 billion) in 2009–2010 to Rs 14 billion (circa US$0.14 billion). The higher education sector continues to face an uncertain future, despite the marginal increase in developmental spending wrought by the new administration in Islamabad: Rs. 18.5 billion (circa US$0.18 billion) in the 2013–2014 budget. According to HEC statistics, the organization's budget as a percentage of national GDP has consistently fallen from the 2006–2007 peak of 0.33% to 0.19% in 2011–2012.

In defiance of the Supreme Court ruling of April 2011, the provincial assembly of Sindh Province passed the unprecedented Sindh Higher Commission Act in 2013 creating Pakistan's first provincial higher education commission. In October 2014, Punjab Province followed suit as part of a massive restructuring of its own higher education system.

Effect of reforms on student numbers and academic output 
Despite the turbulence caused by the legal battle being waged since the 2011 constitutional amendment discussed above, the number of degree-awarding institutions continues to grow throughout the country, both in the private and public sectors. University student rolls have continued to rise, from 0.28 million in 2001 to 0.47 million in 2005 and more than 1.2 million in 2014. Just under half of universities are privately owned.

Between 2002 and 2009, the HEC increased the number of PhD graduates to 6 000 per year and in provided up to 11 000 scholarships for study abroad. The number of Pakistani publications recorded in Thomson Reuter's Web of Science (Science Citation Index Expanded) leapt from 714 to 3 614 over the same period then to 6778 by 2014, and to over 20,000 by 2020. This progress in scientific productivity appears to be due to the momentum generated by the larger numbers of faculty and student scholarships for study abroad, as well as the swelling ranks of PhD graduates. Critics argue that the rapid, massive increase in numbers has compromised quality. However this claim has been refuted by neutral international experts.

Challenges

Pakistan has been known for some of its achievements in science and technology such as successful development of media and military technologies and a growing base of doctors and engineers, as well as its new influx of software engineers who have been contributing to Pakistan's Information Technology industry. Due to present situation in Pakistan, around 3,000 Pakistani doctors emigrate to Western economies in search of suitable employment opportunities and hence contribute intellectually to the health sector of developed countries and at the same time leaving the effects of a brain drain in Pakistan.

Pervez Hoodbhoy published a report on scientific output in Pakistan in which he claimed that research and scientific activities are lower than many other developing countries Hoodbhoy asserted that Pakistan has produced fewer papers than neighboring India. The contentions of Hoodbhoy have been questioned for using outdated data. The increase in research output from Pakistan has been praised after the establishment of the Higher Education Commission in 2002. This is borne out by the graphical comparison between Pakistan and India shown on the right which shows that Pakistan (green)  was 400% behind India (blue)  in research publications per 10 million population in year 2000 but overtook India in 2017 and by 2018, it was about 20% ahead of India according to Web of Science data.

In a report published by Thomson Reuters in 2016, it has been concluded that the rate of increase of highly cited papers in international journals from Pakistan is higher than that from Brazil, Russia, India or China.

Pakistan’s public-sector infrastructure for science and technology is complemented by academic institutions and the strategic and defence sectors. Over the years, these three components have vied for political patronage and societal recognition, leading to duplication and competition between the different bodies.

Scientific research institutions (SRI)

A large part of research is conducted by science research institutes with semi-controlled by the Government. 
International Center for Chemical and Biological Sciences
H.E.J. Research Institute of Chemistry
Dr. Panjwani Centre for Molecular Medicine and Drug Research
School of Biological Sciences, Punjab University
National Center for Physics
National Institute for Biotechnology and Genetic Engineering
Abdus Salam School of Mathematical Sciences
PU Centre for High Energy Physics
Atta-ur-Rahman School of Applied Biosciences, NUST
Institute of Space and Planetary Astrophysics
National Engineering and Scientific Commission
Pakistan Institute of Nuclear Science and Technology
Institute of Space Technology
Council of Scientific and Industrial Research
Nuclear Institute for Agriculture and Biology
Nuclear Institute for Food and Agriculture
Technology Resource Mobilization Unit
Federal Bureau of Statistics
Mathematics Statistical Division

Science community of Pakistan

NUST Science Society
Pakistan Mathematical Society
Pakistan Agricultural Research Council
Pakistan Academy of Sciences
Pakistan Institute of Physics
Pakistan Astrophysicist Society
Pakistan Atomic Energy Commission
Pakistan Atomic Scientists Society
Pakistan Nuclear Society
National Information and Communication Technologies Research and Development Funds
Pakistan Science Foundation
Department of Pakistan Survey
Pakistan Geo-engineering and Geological Survey
Pakistan Cave Research & Caving Federation
Pakistan Physical Society
Pakistan Optical Society
Khwarizmi Science Society
Pakistan science club
Ghulam Ishaq Khan Institute of Engineering Sciences and Technology
Shaheed Zulfiqar Ali Bhutto Institute of Science and Technology
Pakistan Institute of Nuclear Science and Technology
National Institute of Food Science and Technology
USTAD Institute of Science & Technology Abbottabad
Royal Institute of Science & Technology Karachi
Gandhara Institute of Science & Technology
Sukkur Institute of Science & Technology
Bright Institute of Science and technology - Peshawar
Pakistan Advanced Institute of Science and Technology

See also

List of Pakistani inventions and discoveries
List of Pakistani scientists
Economy of Pakistan
Nergis Mavalvala

Sources

Further reading

References

External links
Pakistan to introduce technology in four Muslim countries 
Science, Economy and Peace: A study focusing Pakistan